Alvar Johannes Saukko (28 November 1929, Merijärvi – 6 January 2007) was a Finnish civil servant and politician. He was a member of the Parliament of Finland from 1975 to 1983, representing the Centre Party.

References

1929 births
2007 deaths
People from Merijärvi
Centre Party (Finland) politicians
Members of the Parliament of Finland (1975–79)
Members of the Parliament of Finland (1979–83)